A tourist sign, often referred to as a brown sign, is a traffic sign whose purpose is to direct visitors to tourist destinations, such as historic buildings, tourist regions, caravan or camp sites, picnic areas, sporting facilities or museums. By international convention brown signs with white lettering and white pictograms are often used for this purpose.

In the mid-1970s tourist signs were introduced in France. Since that time the idea of directing tourists to sights and attractions using a uniform type of signage has spread around the world. In Germany these tourist signs were first used in 1984. It is not clear which of the two signs, to the Löwensteiner Berge or to Burg Teck, was first erected there.

Usage 
Tourist signs have three main applications:
 as information signs and signposts that point to important tourist destinations or places of interest in a specific area, such as within a village or a town;
 as standard signs used to mark tourist or holiday routes with special themes; or
 to herald the presence of nearby landscapes, towns and regions, usually on long-distance routes such as motorways.

Design 

In many countries the design and use of tourist signs is laid down in order to ensure a uniform appearance. In addition to their typically brown and white colours, they use sans serif fonts that are easy to read. In order to improve their usefulness for tourists dual languages may be used. The pictograms employed are designed to be simple and meaningful, and are not multi-coloured.

Criticism and reception 
Critics complain that tourists signs contain too much information and distract motorists from concentrating on the road. The number of tourist signs continues to grow and less significant destinations are increasingly being signed. A study carried out at Harz University of Applied Sciences in 2019 found that one in six motorists on German freeways had already spontaneously visited a destination advertised on a tourist information board. Around two thirds could also recall specific contents of individual information boards.

See also 
 Road sign
 Wikipedia:WikiReader/Unterrichtungstafeln for a list of tourist signs in Germany

References

External links 

 Touristic signage on German Autobahns: Perception and reception of touristic roadside signage. Study published by Harz University in 2020 
 Zeichen 386 Touristischer Hinweis ("Sign 386 - Tourist Information") - Tourist signs in the German Road Traffic Act) 
 Die braun-weißen Hinweisschilder an der Autobahn kennt jeder - ihre Schöpfer nicht ("Everyone Knows The Brown and White Signs on the Autobahn...") at www.leo.tu-chemnitz.de 
 Tourist Signs in Great Britain 
 Experience Guide: free audio guide app to the brown signs along the motorways in Germany (currently available for BW, HE, NRW, BAY)

Traffic signs
Tourism